Beatrice Popescu is an engineer at Telecom ParisTech in Paris, France. She was named a Fellow of the Institute of Electrical and Electronics Engineers (IEEE) in 2013 for her contributions to image and video compression and networking. She currently holds 23 patents in wavelet-based video coding.

References 

Fellow Members of the IEEE
Living people
Year of birth missing (living people)
Place of birth missing (living people)